Pterostylis splendens is a plant in the orchid family Orchidaceae and is endemic to New Caledonia. It was first formally described in 1998 by David Jones and Mark Alwin Clements from a specimen cultivated at the Australian National Botanic Gardens from material collected in New Caledonia. The description was published in The Orchadian.

References

splendens
Orchids of New Caledonia
Plants described in 1998